The Climate of Tamil Nadu, India is generally tropical and features fairly hot temperatures over the year except during the monsoon seasons. The city of Chennai lies on the thermal equator, which means Chennai and Tamil Nadu does not have that much temperature variation.

History

Under the Köppen climate classification the greater part of Tamil Nadu fills under Tropical savanna climate and smaller portions of the state fall under Humid subtropical climate; the climate of the state ranges from dry sub-humid to semi-arid.

Seasons

Summer 
The summer in Tamil Nadu runs throughout March, April and May and is characterized by intense heat and scant rainfall across the state.

Monsoon
The state has three distinct periods of rainfall: advanced rainfall; rainfall from the tropical cyclones emerging in the neighbourhood of the Andaman Islands during the Retreat of Monsoons(October–November): and the North-East monsoon during the months of October–December, with dominant northeast monsoon winds from the western disturbances emerging over the Bay of Bengal. The dry season is from February to early June. Mid-June to December is the monsoon months.

Since the state is entirely dependent on rains for recharging its water resources, monsoon failures lead to acute water scarcity and severe droughts.

Tamil Nadu is classified into seven agro-climatic zones: north-east, north-west, west, southern, high rainfall, high altitude hilly, and Cauvery Delta (the most fertile agricultural zone).

Statistics

Temperature

Precipitation

Weatherboxes

Desert Soil

Mostly, desert soils are seen around Madurai , Virudhunagar, Sivaganga, Ramanathapuram and some parts of Tirunelveli dist,  a few adjoining districts. These districts are formally known as the desert districts of Tamil Nadu.

Disasters

Floods
During the 2015 South Indian floods (most affected districts: Chennai, Kanchipuram and Cuddalore), Chennai received 1,049 mm (41.3 in) of rainfall in November, the highest recorded since November 1918 when 1,088 mm (42.8 in) of rainfall was recorded.[24][25] The flooding in Chennai was described as the worst in a century.[26]

Cyclones
Cyclone Ockhi
Cyclone Thane
Cyclone Jal
Cyclone Laila
 Cyclone Vardah
 Cyclone Nadah
Cyclone Gaja
Cyclone Nilam
Cyclone nivar

2004 Asian tsunami disaster

Drought & famine

Pollution

The air quality of industrial areas in Ennore, as well as in Poes Garden and Boat Club are above the standards prescribed by the environment ministry, according to a report by Coastal Resource Centre. 

The centre took eleven air samples in and around North Chennai and Chennai city as part of their air quality study in Ennore 2016.  24-hour samples were taken using filters fitted to a low volume air sampler and analysed for PM 2.5 (Particulate Matter or dust less than 2.5 micrometres in size).
The key documented sources of PM 2.5 pollution are automobile exhaust, burning of coal, burning garbage and landfill, smelting processing of metals.

Surprisingly, 10 out of the 11 air samples were between 1.4 and 3.7 times higher than prescribed by the Ministry of Environment, Forests and Climate Change. The quality of air in Nallathaneer Odai Kuppam in Ennore is the highest with 220 micrograms of particulate matter per cubic meter of air.

Other areas from Ennore include Manali with 156 ug/m3, Sivanpadaiveethi Kuppam with 156. 90 ug/m3 and Kodingayur with 154.90 ug/m3 which is all considered very unhealthy according to the US Environment Protection Agency.

The Ennore region has 3300 MW of installed coal power plant capacity, with more than 1500 acres as dedicated coal ash dumps, says the report.

Highlighting the health effects of bad air quality, Dr Hissamudin Papa, Founder and Director, HUMA Hospitals said, "We visited these areas in Ennore and found various health issues. Children who are 14 to 15 years old look like they are 8 years old. Women have hormonal issues and infertility. Many people have chronic obstructive pulmonary disease in these areas. The pollution needs to be reduced in these areas.

Even areas like Poes Garden and Boat Club ranged 104 and 101 UG/ M3 which is considered unhealthy according to US EPA standards. "The high concentration of polluting industries in the city’s northern and southern edges is affecting all of Chennai," said Dr Rakhal Gaitonde, a public health specialist.

According to the report by the Coastal Resource Centre, the level of manganese in eight of the eleven samples exceed the US EPA reference concentration for exposure to manganese. There are no standards in India for manganese in ambient air. Also, the levels of calcium silicon and crystalline silica, which are enriched in coal ash were found in the air samples.

"Manganese and nickel are well-known toxins and their effects are well-documented. Manganese is predominantly a neurotoxin, while nickel is a carcinogen. The measurement of such toxic substances from the rooftops of human settlements is indeed a cause of concern," added Dr Rakhal.

The Coastal Resource Centre wants the Tamil Nadu government to take immediate action to improve the air quality in Ennore. "The government needs to impose a moratorium on all industrial activities till the environment is restored, initiate long-term and continuous monitoring in Ennore region," said Nityanand Jayaraman, an environment activist.

He added, "No norms are followed by the Tamil Nadu Pollution Control Board. Why should people living in North Chennai have to bear all the harmful effects of the industries?"

The Coastal Resource Centre also wants the government to apprehend polluters and take corrective actions to bring the levels of dust and heavy metals in the dust below detection limits in residential areas.

See also
 Climate of India
 Climatic regions of India

References

Climate of India
Environment of Tamil Nadu